Joy to the World is a Gold album record featuring the Mormon Tabernacle Choir singing classic songs of faith and hope, accompanied by the Philadelphia Brass Ensemble and organist Alexander Schreiner. The album was released as We Wish You A Merry Christmas on CBS Records in the UK in 1976. On January 15, 1985, it was RIAA certified as a Gold album. It was later reissued in 2002 with three bonus tracks (the last three tracks).

Track listing

References

Tabernacle Choir albums
1970 Christmas albums
Christmas albums by American artists
Columbia Records Christmas albums